Baruch Fried, known as Germain Fried (15 March 1905 – 27 November 1963) was a French writer, film editor, film director and scriptwriter.

He coauthored several books with Ernest Fornairon.

Filmography  
Film editor
1931: Paris Béguin by Augusto Genina (with Jean Gabin and Fernandel)
1931: Grock by Carl Boese and 

Assistant director
1933: Paprika by Jean de Limur

Fiilm director
1932: Une faim de loup
1933: Honeymoon Trip, codirected for the French version with Erich Schmidt and Joe May
1934: L'École des resquilleurs
1934: Ces messieurs de la noce
1935:  codirected with Richard Eichberg
1935: Tovaritch codirected with Jacques Deval
1936: 

Scriptwriter
1937: The Kings of Sport by Pierre Colombier
1938:  by Maurice de Canonge

Bibliography 
With Ernest Fornairon at :
 1929: Le Looping de la mort, novelization of Looping the Loop by Arthur Robison (1928)
 1930: Mascarade d'amour, novelization of Love's Masquerade by Augusto Genina (1928) 
 1930: Anny de Montparnasse, novelization of Sinful and Sweet by Karl Lamac (1929)
 1931: Anny, je t'aime, novelization of The Caviar Princess by Karl Lamac (1929)
 1931: Le Mystère du Pôle, novelization of The Call of the North by Nunzio Malasomma and Mario Bonnard (1929)
 1931: Danseurs de cordes, novelization of Katharina Knie by Karl Grune (1930)
 1931: Vive l'amour!, novelization of Good News by Nick Grinde (1930)

References

External links 

French directors
20th-century French screenwriters
French film editors
20th-century French non-fiction writers
1905 births
1963 deaths